The New York County District Attorney, also known as the Manhattan District Attorney, is the elected district attorney for New York County (Manhattan), New York. The office is responsible for the prosecution of violations of New York state laws (federal law violations in Manhattan are prosecuted by the U.S. Attorney for the Southern District of New York). The current district attorney is Alvin Bragg. He was elected in 2021 to succeed Cyrus Vance Jr.

District attorneys are legally permitted to delegate the prosecution of petty crimes or offenses. Prosecutors do not normally handle New York City Criminal Court summons court cases, and the Manhattan district attorney has a memorandum of understanding with the New York City Police Department allowing their legal bureau to selectively prosecute them.

History
In the legislative act of February 12, 1796, New York State was divided into seven districts, each with an Assistant Attorney General, except New York County where Attorney General Josiah Ogden Hoffman prosecuted personally until 1801.

From 1801 to 1813, New York County was part of the First District, which included the counties of New York, Kings, Queens, Richmond, and Suffolk. At that time, Queens included current-day Nassau County and Westchester included the Bronx. In 1813, Westchester County was apportioned to a new district with Rockland and Putnam counties, and in 1815, New York County became the Twelfth District—the only one at the time that was a single county. In 1818, each county in the state became its own district.

From 1874 to 1895, New York County included the West Bronx, and from 1895 to 1913 it included all of what is now Bronx County, governing the same area as does the present Borough of the Bronx. On January 1, 1914, the Bronx became a separate county with its own district attorney.

Until 1822, the district attorney was appointed by the Council of Appointment, and held the office "during the Council's pleasure", meaning that there was no defined term of office. Under the provisions of the New York State Constitution of 1821, the district attorney was appointed to a three-year term by the County Court, and under the provisions of the Constitution of 1846, the office became elective by popular ballot. The term was three years, beginning on January 1 and ending on December 31. In case of a vacancy, an acting district attorney was appointed by the Court of General Sessions until the Governor of New York filled the vacancy with an interim appointment until an election was held for the remainder of the term.

The Consolidation Charter of 1896 extended the term by a year of the incumbent John R. Fellows, who had been elected in 1893 to a three-year term (1894–1896). Since the city election of 1897, the district attorney's term has coincided with the mayor's term and has been four years long. In case of a vacancy, the governor can make an interim appointment until a special election is held for the remainder of the term.

Gallery

List of district attorneys

The New York County District Attorney in popular culture

Films
 Legal Eagles (1986)

Television series
 The D.A.'s Man, which ran for a single season on NBC in 1959, starred John Compton as Shannon, an undercover investigator for the Manhattan DA's office.  Produced by Jack Webb, the series fictionalized the career of real-life Manhattan DA's Investigator Harold Danforth, whose autobiography, also titled The D.A.'s Man, written in collaboration with veteran, Pulitzer Prize-winning police reporter James D. Horan, had won an Edgar from the Mystery Writers of America for Best Fact Crime Book.
 For the People starred William Shatner as an idealistic young deputy district attorney in the Manhattan DA's Office, Howard Da Silva as his supervisor, and Lonny Chapman as his investigator.
 Hawk, which ran for a half-season in 1966, starred Burt Reynolds as Lt. John Hawk, a detective assigned to NYPD's Manhattan DA's Squad.
 Cagney & Lacey was revived in 1994 for a series of irregularly scheduled two-hour TV-movies.  In the interim between these films and the original series, Cagney had been promoted to lieutenant and placed in command of the NYPD's Manhattan DA's Squad.  Lacey, having retired some years earlier was persuaded to return to police work as a criminal investigator for the Manhattan DA's Bureau of Investigation, allowing the two partners to work together again.  There were four movies in the revived series between 1994 and 1996.
 Blue Bloods: Depicts the prosecution of criminal suspects by lawyers of the New York County District Attorney's office through the character assistant district attorney Erin Reagan (Bridget Moynahan), who started out the series as a Trial Division Assistant District Attorney before being promoted to Deputy Bureau Chief in toward the end of Season 3 and then to Trial Division Bureau Chief at the start of Season 9.  Since Season 5, Erin has worked closely with D.A. Investigator Anthony Abetemarco (Steven R. Schirripa).
 Law & Order: The long-running television series Law & Order and its spin-offs depict the prosecution of criminal suspects by lawyers of the New York County District Attorney's office.  In the original pilot episode "Everybody's Favorite Bagman", shot in 1988, Roy Thinnes was cast as District Attorney Alfred Wentworth.  Subsequent district attorneys depicted in the franchise are Adam Schiff (1990–2000), Nora Lewin (2000–2002), Arthur Branch (2002–2007) and Jack McCoy (2008–2011, 2018–Present).  Law & Order ceased production in 2010, but McCoy (though not seen) was still occasionally mentioned as being the Manhattan district attorney in the spin-off series Law & Order: Special Victims Unit in several episodes through 2011.  A reference to "the new DA" in a 2013 episode indicated that McCoy had moved on from the position presumably sometime in 2012; his replacement was unnamed.  However, McCoy became the district attorney again as of 2018, showing up in an SVU episode and later during the 21st season of Law & Order that started in 2022.

References

External links
 Manhattanda.org

 
1815 establishments in New York (state)